Simion Cuțov (7 May 1952 – 1993) was a lightweight boxer from Romania who won the European amateur title in 1973 and 1975. He competed at the 1974 World Championships and 1976 and 1980 Olympics and won silver medals in 1974 and 1976. In 1974, he won a gold medal at the Balkan Games. He retired with a record of 20 losses out of 155 bouts. His elder brother Calistrat was also an Olympic boxer.

1976 Olympic results
Below is the record of Simion Cuțov, a Romanian lightweight boxer who competed at the 1976 Montreal Olympics:

 Round of 64: bye
 Round of 32: defeated Sylvester Mittee (Great Britain) referee stopped contest in the third round
 Round of 16: defeated Nelson Calzadilla (Venezuela) by decision, 5-0
 Quarterfinal: defeated Ove Lundby (Sweden) by decision, 5-0
 Semifinal: defeated Vassily Solomin (Soviet Union) by decision, 5-0
 Final: lost to Howard Davis (United States) by decision, 0-5 (was awarded silver medal)

References

External links

1952 births
1993 deaths
Lightweight boxers
Boxers at the 1976 Summer Olympics
Boxers at the 1980 Summer Olympics
Olympic boxers of Romania
Olympic silver medalists for Romania
Olympic medalists in boxing
Romanian male boxers
AIBA World Boxing Championships medalists
Medalists at the 1976 Summer Olympics
People from Brăila County